Robert White McFarland may refer to:

 Robert McFarland (American football) (born 1961), American football coach
 Robert McFarland (cricketer) (1847–1876), Australian cricketer
 Robert White McFarland (1825–1910), American engineer

See also
Robert MacFarlane (disambiguation)